Atomic Swing is a Swedish pop rock group formed in 1992. Their debut album, A Car Crash in the Blue, produced several hits in the Swedish charts. After an intense period the band split up, in 1997. The band reunited in 2006 and their latest album is called The Broken Habanas.

The Atomic Swing repertoire spans both dynamic and upbeat pop-rock hits and softer ballads, all characterized by Niclas Frisk's special vocal style and inventive guitar tracks.

Members
 Niclas Frisk - vocals, guitar, songwriter
 Micke Lohse - keyboard and backing vocals
 Henrik Berglund - drums and percussion
 Petter Orwin (Dahlström) - Bass guitar and backing vocals
 Anders Graham-Paulsson - bass (1996-1997)

Discography

Albums
 A Car Crash in the Blue (1993) AUS #96 
 Bossanova Swap Meet (1994) 
 Fluff (1997)
 In Their Finest Hour (Greatest Hits) (1998)
 The Broken Habanas (2006)

References

External links 
 Official Myspace
  Atomic Swing, Past and Present
 From Venus To Atomic

Swedish pop rock music groups
Artists from Dalarna
Musical quartets